Zeberkhan Rural District is a rural district in the Central District of Zeberkhan County, Razavi Khorasan province, Iran. At the 2016 census, its population was 14,965, in 4,977 families. At the 2006 census, its population was 14,762, in 4,123 families. The rural district has 35 villages.

References 

Rural Districts of Razavi Khorasan Province
Nishapur County